The Maputo Post Office Building (Portuguese: Edifício dos Correios de Maputo) is the headquarters of Correios de Moçambique, the Mozambican postal service. It was built in 1903 by the architect Carlos Rome Machado. The Portuguese State Post (CTT Correios de Portugal), which was responsible for both post and telecommunications in the Portuguese Mozambique, was located in the building until 1975. The building has housed the state postal company since independence. As postal service in Mozambique remains limited, the government waterworks and the Bank BCI use a portion of the customer counter of the building.

References

Buildings and structures in Maputo
Government buildings completed in 1903
Post office buildings
Portuguese colonial architecture in Mozambique